Forest Animal Rescue by Peace River Refuge and Ranch is an American nonprofit wildlife sanctuary in Florida.

Overview 

Forest Animal Rescue was founded in 1998. This animal sanctuary has been located in Silver Springs, Marion County, Florida, since 2013.

This facility offers educational advancement, natural wilderness awareness, as well as volunteer/intern opportunities through worldwide wildlife efforts.

The wildlife refuge is a 501(c)(3) nonprofit organization. It is accredited through national organizations such as World Animal Protection and the American Sanctuary Association, which maintain high standards for captive exotic animal programs.

References 

Medina, Carlos E. (October 30, 2016). Ocala StarBanner.
Guidestar.org
Greatnonprofits.org

External links
Forest Animal Rescue's homepage

Animal sanctuaries
Environmental organizations based in Florida
Animal welfare organizations based in the United States
Organizations established in 1998
1998 establishments in Florida